The Montreal Nationals were a Canadian football team in Ontario Rugby Football Union. The team played in the 1938 season. The teams was preceded by the CNR Nationals, who played one year, 1937, in the short lived Quebec Rugby Football Union revival; this team formed the basis for the ORFU team.

Canadian Football Hall of Famers
John Ferraro

QRFU & ORFU seasons

References

Ontario Rugby Football Union teams
Defunct Canadian football teams
Ind